The University of Guilan (Danushgah-e Gilân) is an institute of higher education and graduate studies in Rasht, a large city in the province of Guilan, in Northern Iran, bordering the Caspian Sea.

It has nearly 24,000 students enrolled. According to the latest Shanghai ranking, University of Guilan was ranked 8th among Iran's comprehensive universities in 2013. [3] Also, based on the Times ranking in 2019, this University was ranked 6th among Iran's comprehensive universities.[4]

History 
The university was founded in 1974 as a collaborative effort between Iran and West Germany. It began with 170 students and 10 faculty members in the faculty of engineering and faculty of literature, offering courses such as Civil Engineering and German Literature.

The University of Guilan started its academic activities with 120 students in the departments of Physics, Mathematics, Chemistry, Biology, Agronomy, Animal Husbandry and German Literature.

Academics
The University of Guilan offers degrees in 55 fields for Bachelors, 35 fields for Masters, and seven fields for PhD studies. It is the largest university in the province.

The institute has a department in Caspian Sea studies.

The Caspian Journal of Environmental Sciences is a semi-annual official publication of AUCRS (Association of Universities of Caspian Region States), published by University of Guilan. There are other journals published in English or Persian languages by the university.

There is a wide range of courses offered in the faculties of Science, Mathematics, Engineering, Agriculture, Humanities, Physical Education, Natural Resources, and the College of Art and Architecture. More than 112 courses are on offer in 35 departments leading to B.Sc., M.Sc., B.A., M.A., and Ph.D. degrees.

With nearly 650 faculty members, nine faculties, and three research centers, all in a very large campus, as well as some other places in Guilan province, the University of Guilan, is recognized as the largest and one of the most premier academic institutions in northern Iran. There are nearly 24,000 students in 112 fields of study, including undergraduate, postgraduate and research scholars.

Campus
The university is spread over four campuses with a total area of about 3 km2.

Notable faculty members and honors 
There are several active and recognizable scientific faces in the University of Guilan; at least three of them are known as premier scientists within the 1 percent of the world's most pioneer scientists in the development of advanced sciences.  In addition, several of its graduate students are studying in worldwide high-rank universities; although many students prefer to stay at the University of Guilan.

Scientific books have been published during the last decades and internationally and nationally credible journals are published by the university press.

Faculties
The University of Guilan has spread over four campuses housing nine faculties, as well as an International Campus and some research centers. The main faculties are:
 Faculty of Architecture and Arts
 Faculty of Agricultural Sciences
 Faculty of Engineering
 Faculty of Humanities
 Faculty of Mathematical Sciences
 Faculty of Mechanical Engineering
 Faculty of Natural Resources
 Faculty of Physical education
 Faculty of Sciences
 Faculty of Engineering and Technology (east of Guilan)

External links
Official website (in Persian)
Official website (in English)

References

Universities in Iran
Educational institutions established in 1974
Education in Gilan Province
Buildings and structures in Gilan Province